Corrales FBC is a fútsal club in the Barrio Obrero of Asunción in Paraguay. The club participates in the Asociación Paraguaya de Fútbol's fútsal league.

History

2002
In 2002, Corrales played in the Asociación Paraguaya de Fútbol's División de Ascenso.

2003
In 2003, the club played in the Asociación Paraguaya de Fútbol's División Intermedia (Copa de Bronce) Fútsal League, being defeated 6 to 4 against Luis Guanella in the first round match of their Serie A Group.

2009
In 2009, the club fielded a team in the Senior Fútsal Championship organized by Club Fomento in Barrio Obrero in Asunción.

Venue

Location
Corrales FBC fútsal venue is located in Barrio Obrero in Asunción.

See also
 Futsal in Paraguay
 Campeonato de Futsal de Paraguay

References

External links
 Official Facebook Page

Futsal clubs in Paraguay
Futsal in Paraguay